"Why Is Her Door Locked?" is the ninth episode of the first series of the British television series, Upstairs, Downstairs. The episode is set in the summer of 1907.

"Why Is Her Door Locked?" was among the episodes omitted from Upstairs, Downstairs''' initial Masterpiece Theatre broadcast in 1974, and was consequently not shown on US television until 1989.

Cast
Regular cast
 Gordon Jackson (Agnus Hudson) 
 Jean Marsh (Rose Buck)
 Joan Benham ( Lady Prudence Fairfax) 
 David Langton (Richard Bellamy) 
 Simon Williams (James Bellamy) 
 Angela Baddeley (Mrs. Bridges) 
 Jenny Tomasin (Ruby)

Guest cast
 Michael Guest (The Milkman) 
 Maggie Wells (Doris) 
 Susan Porrett (Alice) 
 Janie Booth (Lily Webber) 
 David Strong (Arthur Webber) 
 John Malcolm (Inspector Cape) 
 Philip Lennard (The Magistrate) 
 Bill Horsley (Perry) 
 John Scott Martin (The Usher) 
 William Gossling (Clerk of the Court) 
 Ken Halliwell (Uniformed PC)
 Leonard Kingston (Magistrate's Clerk) 
 Jimmy Mac (Magistrate) 
 Bill Prentice (Solicitor) 
 Charles Shaw Hesketh (Magistrate) 
 Charlotte Simmonds (The stolen Baby Webber)

Plot
After Emily's death, Mrs. Bridges takes leave of her senses. She is sitting in her chair, crying brokenheartedly, and feeling very guilty. Mrs. Bridges, distraught with remorse over Emily's death, steals a baby from its pram outside a shop and hides it in her room, locking her door. Richard and Lady Marjorie return the baby to its parents Lily and Arthur Webber. Mrs Bridges only escapes a jail sentence after Hudson agrees to marry her once they are no longer in service.https://www.imdb.com/title/tt0738039/ 

References

 External links 
Updown.org.uk - Upstairs, Downstairs'' Fansite

Upstairs, Downstairs (series 1) episodes
1972 British television episodes
Fiction set in 1907